This is a list of the mammal species recorded in Libya. There are ninety-seven mammal species in Libya, of which three are critically endangered, one is endangered, five are vulnerable, and one is near threatened. Two of the species listed for Libya can no longer be found in the wild.

The following tags are used to highlight each species' conservation status as assessed by the International Union for Conservation of Nature:

Some species were assessed using an earlier set of criteria. Species assessed using this system have the following instead of near threatened and least concern categories:

Order: Macroscelidea (elephant shrews) 

Often called sengi, the elephant shrews or jumping shrews are native to southern Africa. Their common English name derives from their elongated flexible snout and their resemblance to the true shrews.
Family: Macroscelididae (elephant shrews)
Genus: Elephantulus
 North African elephant shrew, Elephantulus rozeti LC

Order: Hyracoidea (hyraxes) 

The hyraxes are any of four species of fairly small, thickset, herbivorous mammals in the order Hyracoidea. About the size of a domestic cat they are well-furred, with rounded bodies and a stumpy tail. They are native to Africa and the Middle East.
Family: Procaviidae (hyraxes)
Genus: Procavia
 Cape hyrax, Procavia capensis LC

Order: Proboscidea (elephants) 

The elephants comprise three living species and are the largest living land animals.
Family: Elephantidae (elephants)
Genus: Loxodonta
African bush elephant, L. africana 
 North African elephant, L. a. pharaohensis extirpated

Order: Primates 

The order Primates contains humans and their closest relatives: lemurs, lorisoids, tarsiers, monkeys, and apes.

Suborder: Haplorhini
Infraorder: Simiiformes
Parvorder: Catarrhini
Superfamily: Cercopithecoidea
Family: Cercopithecidae
Genus: Macaca
 Barbary macaque, Macaca sylvanus EN

Order: Rodentia (rodents) 

Rodents make up the largest order of mammals, with over 40% of mammalian species. They have two incisors in the upper and lower jaw which grow continually and must be kept short by gnawing.

Suborder: Hystricognathi
Family: Hystricidae (Old World porcupines)
Genus: Hystrix
 Crested porcupine, Hystrix cristata LC
Suborder: Sciurognathi
Family: Sciuridae (squirrels)
Subfamily: Xerinae
Tribe: Xerini
Genus: Atlantoxerus
 Barbary ground squirrel, Atlantoxerus getulus LC
Suborder: Sciurognathi
Family: Gliridae (dormice)
Subfamily: Leithiinae
Genus: Eliomys
 Asian garden dormouse, Eliomys melanurus LC
Family: Dipodidae (jerboas)
Subfamily: Allactaginae
Genus: Allactaga
 Four-toed jerboa, Allactaga tetradactyla DD
Subfamily: Dipodinae
Genus: Jaculus
 Lesser Egyptian jerboa, Jaculus jaculus LC
 Greater Egyptian jerboa, Jaculus orientalis LC
Family: Spalacidae
Subfamily: Spalacinae
Genus: Nannospalax
 Middle East blind mole-rat, Nannospalax ehrenbergi LC
Family: Cricetidae
Subfamily: Arvicolinae
Genus: Microtus
 Günther's vole, Microtus guentheri LC
Family: Muridae (mice, rats, voles, gerbils, hamsters, etc.)
Subfamily: Deomyinae
Genus: Acomys
 Cairo spiny mouse, Acomys cahirinus LC
Subfamily: Gerbillinae
Genus: Dipodillus
 North African gerbil, Dipodillus campestris LC
Genus: Gerbillus
 Pleasant gerbil, Gerbillus amoenus DD
 Anderson's gerbil, Gerbillus andersoni LR/lc
 Lesser Egyptian gerbil, Gerbillus gerbillus LC
 Grobben's gerbil, Gerbillus grobbeni DD
 Pygmy gerbil, Gerbillus henleyi LC
 Lataste's gerbil, Gerbillus latastei DD
 Balochistan gerbil, Gerbillus nanus LC
 Lesser short-tailed gerbil, Gerbillus simoni LC
 Sand gerbil, Gerbillus syrticus DD
 Tarabul's gerbil, Gerbillus tarabuli LC
Genus: Meriones
 Sundevall's jird, Meriones crassus LC
 Libyan jird, Meriones libycus LC
 Shaw's jird, Meriones shawi LC
Genus: Pachyuromys
 Fat-tailed gerbil, Pachyuromys duprasi LC
Genus: Psammomys
 Sand rat, Psammomys obesus LC
 Thin sand rat, Psammomys vexillaris DD
Subfamily: Murinae
Genus: Mus
 Algerian mouse, Mus spretus LC
Family: Ctenodactylidae
Genus: Ctenodactylus
 Gundi, Ctenodactylus gundi LC
 Val's gundi, Ctenodactylus vali DD
Genus: Massoutiera
 Mzab gundi, Massoutiera mzabi LC

Order: Lagomorpha (lagomorphs) 

The lagomorphs comprise two families, Leporidae (hares and rabbits), and Ochotonidae (pikas). Though they can resemble rodents, and were classified as a superfamily in that order until the early 20th century, they have since been considered a separate order. They differ from rodents in a number of physical characteristics, such as having four incisors in the upper jaw rather than two.

Family: Leporidae (rabbits, hares)
Genus: Lepus
 Cape hare, Lepus capensis LR/lc
 African savanna hare, Lepus microtis LR/lc

Order: Erinaceomorpha (hedgehogs and gymnures) 

The order Erinaceomorpha contains a single family, Erinaceidae, which comprise the hedgehogs and gymnures. The hedgehogs are easily recognised by their spines while gymnures look more like large rats.

Family: Erinaceidae (hedgehogs)
Subfamily: Erinaceinae
Genus: Atelerix
 North African hedgehog, Atelerix algirus LR/lc
Genus: Hemiechinus
 Desert hedgehog, Hemiechinus aethiopicus LR/lc
 Long-eared hedgehog, Hemiechinus auritus LR/lc

Order: Soricomorpha (shrews, moles, and solenodons) 

The "shrew-forms" are insectivorous mammals. The shrews and solenodons closely resemble mice while the moles are stout-bodied burrowers.

Family: Soricidae (shrews)
Subfamily: Crocidurinae
Genus: Crocidura
 Cyrenaica shrew, Crocidura aleksandrisi LC
Genus: Suncus
 Etruscan shrew, Suncus etruscus LC

Order: Chiroptera (bats) 

The bats' most distinguishing feature is that their forelimbs are developed as wings, making them the only mammals capable of flight. Bat species account for about 20% of all mammals.

Family: Pteropodidae (flying foxes, Old World fruit bats)
Subfamily: Pteropodinae
Genus: Rousettus
 Egyptian fruit bat, Rousettus aegyptiacus LC
Family: Vespertilionidae
Subfamily: Myotinae
Genus: Myotis
 Felten's myotis, Myotis punicus DD
Subfamily: Vespertilioninae
Genus: Eptesicus
 Serotine bat, Eptesicus serotinus LR/lc
Genus: Nyctalus
 Greater noctule bat, Nyctalus lasiopterus LR/nt
 Lesser noctule, Nyctalus leisleri LR/nt
Genus: Otonycteris
 Desert long-eared bat, Otonycteris hemprichii LR/lc
Genus: Pipistrellus
 Egyptian pipistrelle, Pipistrellus deserti LC
 Kuhl's pipistrelle, Pipistrellus kuhlii LC
 Common pipistrelle, Pipistrellus pipistrellus LC
 Rüppell's pipistrelle, Pipistrellus rueppelli LC
Genus: Plecotus
 Christie's big-eared bat, Plecotus christiei DD
 Canary big-eared bat, Plecotus teneriffae DD
Subfamily: Miniopterinae
Genus: Miniopterus
 Common bent-wing bat, Miniopterus schreibersii LC
Family: Rhinopomatidae
Genus: Rhinopoma
 Egyptian mouse-tailed bat, R. cystops 
 Lesser mouse-tailed bat, Rhinopoma hardwickei LC
 Greater mouse-tailed bat, Rhinopoma microphyllum LC
Family: Nycteridae
Genus: Nycteris
 Egyptian slit-faced bat, Nycteris thebaica LC
Family: Rhinolophidae
Subfamily: Rhinolophinae
Genus: Rhinolophus
 Geoffroy's horseshoe bat, Rhinolophus clivosus LC
 Mehely's horseshoe bat, Rhinolophus mehelyi VU
Subfamily: Hipposiderinae
Genus: Asellia
 Trident leaf-nosed bat, Asellia tridens LC

Order: Cetacea (whales) 

The order Cetacea includes whales, dolphins and porpoises. They are the mammals most fully adapted to aquatic life with a spindle-shaped nearly hairless body, protected by a thick layer of blubber, and forelimbs and tail modified to provide propulsion underwater.

Species listed below also includes species being recorded in Levantine Sea.

Suborder: Mysticeti
Family: Balaenopteridae
Genus: Balaenoptera
 Common minke whale, Balaenoptera acutorostrata LC
 Fin whale, Balaenoptera physalus EN
 Blue whale, Balaenoptera m. musculus  EN (possible)
Subfamily: Megapterinae
Genus: Megaptera
 Humpback whale, Megaptera novaeangliae LC and CR (Arabian Sea population)
Family: Balaenidae
Genus: Eubalaena
 North Atlantic right whale, Eubalaena glacialis CR (possible)
Suborder: Odontoceti
Superfamily: Platanistoidea
Family: Delphinidae (marine dolphins)
Genus: Steno
 Rough-toothed dolphin, Steno bredanensis DD
Genus: Delphinus
 Short-beaked common dolphin, Delphinus delphis LR/lc
Genus: Orcinus
 Orca, Orcinus orca LR/cd
Genus: Pseudorca 
 False killer whale, Pseudorca crassidens DD
Genus: Globicephala
 Long-finned pilot whale, Globicephala melas LR/lc
Genus: Grampus 
 Risso's dolphin, Grampus griseus LC
Genus: Stenella 
 Striped dolphin, Stenella coeruleoalba DD
Genus Tursiops
 Common bottlenose dolphin, Tursiops truncatus LC
Family Physeteridae (sperm whales)
Genus: Physeter
 Sperm whale, Physeter catodon VU
Superfamily Ziphioidea (beaked whales) 
Family Ziphidae 
Genus: Ziphius 
Cuvier's beaked whale, Ziphius cavirostris LC

Order: Carnivora (carnivorans) 

There are over 260 species of carnivorans, the majority of which feed primarily on meat. They have a characteristic skull shape and dentition. 
Suborder: Feliformia
Family: Felidae (cats)
Subfamily: Felinae
Genus: Acinonyx
 Cheetah, A. jubatus	
 Northwest African cheetah, A. j. hecki 
Genus: Caracal
 Caracal, Caracal caracal LC
Genus: Felis
African wildcat, F. lybica 
 Sand cat, Felis margarita NT
Subfamily: Pantherinae	
Genus: Panthera
 Leopard P. pardus  extirpated	
Family: Viverridae (civets, mongooses, etc.)
Subfamily: Viverrinae
Genus: Genetta
 Common genet, Genetta genetta LC
Family: Herpestidae (mongooses)
Genus: Herpestes
 Egyptian mongoose, Herpestes ichneumon LC
Family: Hyaenidae (hyaenas)
Genus: Hyaena
 Striped hyena, Hyaena hyaena NT
Suborder: Caniformia
Family: Canidae (dogs, foxes)
Genus: Canis
 African golden wolf, Canis lupaster LC
Genus: Lycaon
 African wild dog, Lycaon pictus EN
Genus: Vulpes
 Rüppell's fox, Vulpes rueppelli LC
 Red fox, Vulpes vulpes LC
 Fennec, Vulpes zerda LC
Family: Mustelidae (mustelids)
Genus: Ictonyx
 Saharan striped polecat, Ictonyx libyca LC
Genus: Mustela
 Least weasel, Mustela nivalis LC
Family: Phocidae (earless seals)
Genus: Monachus
 Mediterranean monk seal, Monachus monachus EN

Order: Artiodactyla (even-toed ungulates) 

The even-toed ungulates are ungulates whose weight is borne about equally by the third and fourth toes, rather than mostly or entirely by the third as in perissodactyls. There are about 220 artiodactyl species, including many that are of great economic importance to humans.
Family: Bovidae (cattle, antelope, sheep, goats)
Subfamily: Antilopinae
Genus: Gazella
Dorcas gazelle, G. dorcas 
Rhim gazelle, G. leptoceros 
Genus: Nanger
 Dama gazelle, N. dama  
Subfamily: Caprinae
Genus: Ammotragus
 Barbary sheep, A. lervia

Locally extinct 
The following species are locally extinct in the country:
 Lion, Panthera leo
 Brown bear, Ursus arctos
 Addax, A. nasomaculatus 
 Scimitar oryx, Oryx dammah 
 Hartebeest, A. buselaphus 
 Wild boar, Sus scrofa  extirpated

See also
List of chordate orders
Lists of mammals by region
List of prehistoric mammals
Mammal classification
List of mammals described in the 2000s

Notes

References
 

Libya
Libya
Mammals